Harinagar is a panchayat village located in the Mayabunder block of South Andaman district, Andaman and Nicobar Islands in India. In 2008–09, its population was 1809.

References 

Villages in South Andaman district